Umaro Mokhtar Sissoco Embaló (born 23 September 1972) is a Bissau-Guinean politician serving as the president of Guinea-Bissau since  February 2020. He is a political scientist and military officer who previously served as prime minister between November 2016 and January 2018.

Life
Born in Bissau, Embaló holds a degree in international relations from the Higher Institute of Social and Political Sciences at the Technical University of Lisbon, as well as both a master's degree in political science and a doctorate in international relations from the Complutense University of Madrid. He is fluent in Portuguese and Spanish, and competent in English, French, Arabic and Swahili.

Embaló served in the military, undertaking National Defense Studies at the National Defense Center of Spain, and underwent further studies on National Security in Brussels, Tel Aviv, Johannesburg, Japan and Paris. He rose to the rank of brigadier-general. Before his political career, Embaló academically specialised in African and Middle-Eastern affairs and in matters of defence, international co-operation and development. He is a former Minister of African Affairs.

Prime ministership
Embaló formed his cabinet on 13 December 2016 after having been appointed prime minister by President José Mário Vaz on 18 November 2016.

However, Embaló took the post while under a boycott of his own party, the African Party for the Independence of Guinea and Cape Verde (PAIGC), which through its Central Committee gave him a vote of distrust of one hundred and twelve votes in favor and eleven against on 26 November 2016.

As head of government, he could only count on the support of the Social Renovation Party, which had the second largest number of seats in the National People's Congress of Guinea-Bissau.

On 13 January 2018, after disagreements with President José Mário Vaz, he was replaced according to the demands of João Fadiá (minister of finance) and Botche Candé (minister of the interior), Embaló requested his resignation from the position, effective on 16 January 2018.

2019 presidential elections
Embaló ran for president in 2019, running as the candidate of Madem G15. He finished in second place, with 27% of the vote, in the first round of voting. According to the preliminary and final results published by the national commission of elections, he won the runoff vote against another ex-prime minister, Domingos Simões Pereira, 54% to 46%. However, the final results continue to be disputed by his opponent Domingos Simões Pereira. Although neither the supreme court of Guinea-Bissau nor the parliament had given its approval for the official swearing-in ceremony, Sissoco Embaló had organized an alternative swearing-in ceremony in a hotel in Bissau to announce himself as legal president of Guinea-Bissau. Several politicians in Guinea-Bissau, including Prime Minister Aristides Gomes, accused Sissoco Embaló of arranging a coup d'état, although outgoing president Mário Vaz stepped down to allow Embaló to take power.

Presidency 
Sissoco Embaló has stated that his governing style is that of "Embaloism", which he defines as "order, discipline, and development", asserting that "there is neither small state nor small president" and comparing himself to Lee Kuan Yew and Rodrigo Duterte. As part of an anti-corruption drive, he ordered the installation of CCTV surveillance cameras across the country and the arrest of Minister of Public Health Antonio Deuna on embezzlement charges in 2021. 

In 2020, his presidency saw the retreat of Economic Community of West African States troops stationed in the country after the 2012 coup and attempts to arrange official visits from foreign heads of government, including the first visit from the Portuguese government in three decades, and international organisations such as the International Monetary Fund. His first official visit as head of state was a multi-country tour of Senegal, Niger, and Nigeria in March 2020. 

A coup d'état to oust Embaló was attempted on 1 February 2022. He said that "many" members of the security forces had been killed in a "failed attack against democracy."

Honours
Foreign
  Grand Cordon of the Supreme Order of the Renaissance (20 February 2023).

References

|-

1972 births
Presidents of Guinea-Bissau
Bissau-Guinean military personnel
Bissau-Guinean Muslims
Living people
Prime Ministers of Guinea-Bissau
People from Bissau
African Party for the Independence of Guinea and Cape Verde politicians
Technical University of Lisbon alumni
Complutense University of Madrid alumni